St Mary's Methodist Church, Hugh Town is a Methodist church in Hugh Town, Isles of Scilly. It is currently Grade II listed.

History
Bible Christians arrived in the islands and began preaching from the Bishop and Wolf Inn. The first chapel was built on Church Street in Hugh Town around 1836 (and is now used as the Masonic Hall).

The current chapel was built at a cost of around £1,300 between 1899 and 1900 to the designs of the architect A. J. Trenear. The foundation stone was laid on Thursday 20 April 1899 in the presence of Rev. W. B. Lark, President of the Bible Christian Conference. The Governor of the Islands, T. A. Dorrien-Smith, agreed to take the old chapel which adjoined the St Mary's Girls’ day school and build a new Sunday school adjoining the chapel. Alfred Trenear was contracted for carpentering, painting and glazing at £746, and Messrs John Ellis and Son were contracted for the masonry and plastering at £444. Local famers carted stone from the quarry free of charge. The chapel was built to seat 350 people, 198 on the ground floor and 152 in the gallery.

George Woodcock of Church Street, St Mary's, laid the principal foundation stone. Jabez Gibson of St Martin's laid the Visitors stone. Miss Ada Jenkins of St Mary's laid a stone on behalf of the Christian Endeavour, and Norman and George Roberts laid the Sunday-school stone.

In the 1930s, it merged with the Wesleyan Methodist Church and the rostrum and communion rail were moved from the Wesleyan Chapel and installed in the Church Street chapel.

Organ
The pipe organ by Hele and Company of Plymouth was installed in 1910.

See also

St Martin's Methodist Church, Isles of Scilly

References

Churches completed in 1900
Methodist churches in Cornwall
Churches in the Isles of Scilly
Grade II listed buildings in Cornwall
St Mary's, Isles of Scilly